Napalm Records is an Austrian independent record label focused on heavy metal and hard rock. Originally, Napalm focused on black metal bands, such as Abigor and Summoning, and folk metal bands, such as Falkenbach and Vintersorg. The label later expanded its roster by adding gothic metal, symphonic metal, power metal, doom metal, metalcore and nu metal bands, as well as stoner rock acts Monster Magnet, Karma to Burn, and Brant Bjork, and even folk bands like Ye Banished Privateers. Napalm has its own publishing house named Iron Avantgarde Publishing.

In November 2020, Napalm acquired the German record label SPV GmbH.

Roster 

1914
Æther Realm
Accept
Ad Infinitum
Adept
Agathodaimon
The Agonist
Ahab
Alestorm
Alien Weaponry
Alissa
Alter Bridge
Amberian Dawn
Andrew W.K.
Angus McSix
Arkona
Audrey Horne
Battlelore
Batushka
Be'lakor
Before The Dawn
Black Mirrors
Bloodbath
Bodom After Midnight
Bomber
Bornholm
BPMD
The Brew
Brymir
Burning Witches
Candlemass
Charlotte Wessels
Civil War
Coal Chamber
Cobra Spell
Cold
Conan
Cradle of Filth
Crematory
Crimson Shadows
Crypta
The Dark Side of the Moon
Darkwoods My Betrothed
Dawn of Disease
Dee Snider
Defacing God
Dagoba
Death Dealer Union
Delain
Destruction
DevilDriver
Diabulus in Musica
Dieth
Draconian
Dragony
Einherjer
Ektomorf
Elvellon
End of Green
Evergrey
Evile 
Evil Invaders
Exit Eden
 Feuerschwanz
Gloryhammer
Glowsun
God Is an Astronaut
Hällas
Hammer King
Heidevolk
The Hellfreaks
Hinayana (band)
Hiraes
IGNEA
Imperium Dekadenz
Infected Rain
Jinjer
John Garcia
Kamelot
Karl Sanders
Katatonia
Kissin' Dynamite
Kontrust
Konvent
League of Distortion
Legion of the Damned
Lord of the Lost
Marianas Rest
Månegarm
Me and That Man
Megaherz
Midnattsol
Monkey3
Monster Magnet
Moonspell
Mushroomhead
Myles Kennedy
My Sleeping Karma
Nachtblut
Nanowar of Steel
Nervosa
Nestor
The New Roses
Nile
Livlos
Nytt Land
Oh Hiroshima
Oomph!
Paddy and the Rats
Persefone
Powerwolf
Roadwolf
Rumahoy
RYUJIN
Samael
Satyricon
Scar of the Sun
Schandmaul
Scott Stapp
Serenity
SETYØURSAILS
Serum 114
Silent Skies
Sirenia
Shining
Shylmagoghnar
Skálmöld
Sojourner
Space of Variations
Stälker
Stormruler
Subway to Sally
Summoning
Temperance
Tetrarch
There's a Light
Thulcandra
Tiamat
Tortuga 
Toxpack
Tragedy 
Tremonti
Tristania
Trollfest
The Ugly Kings
The Unguided
Unleash the Archers
Unleashed
Untamed Land
Van Canto
Varg
Vexed
Victorius
Villagers of Ioannina City
The Vintage Caravan
Vintersorg
Visions of Atlantis
Warbringer
Warfect
:de:Warkings
W.A.S.P.
Wednesday 13
Wizardthrone
Wind Rose
Wolfheart
Wolftooth
Xandria
Year of the Goat
Ye Banished Privateers

Former artists 

8kids
Abigor
Alunah
American Head Charge
Angizia
The Answer
Ásmegin
Atrocity
Belphegor
Beseech
Beyond the Black
Bloody Hammers
Bokassa
Brant Bjork
The Bulletmonks
Cavalera Conspiracy
Cvlt Ov The Svn
Dargaard
Dark Sarah
Darkwell
Deadlock
Die Kreatur
Diemonds
Die Verbannten Kinder Evas
Dominion III
Dropout Kings
Dust Bolt
Edenbridge
Elis
Enthroned
Ex Deo
Fairyland
Falkenbach
Fejd
Finsterforst
F.K.Ü.
Glittertind
Gormathon
HammerFall
Grave Digger
Greenleaf
Hate
Hatesphere
Heavatar
Hoobastank
Hollenthon
Huntress
Ice Ages
In Battle
Iron Fire
Isole
Jaldaboath
Jungle Rot
Kampfar
Karma to Burn
Katra
Kobra and the Lotus
Korpiklaani
Lacrimas Profundere
Leaves' Eyes
Life of Agony
Lunatica
Majesty
Mammoth Mammoth
Mehida
The Midnight Ghost Train
Mortemia
Myriads
Nemesea
Nightmare
Otep
Otyg
Paragon
Power Quest
Product of Hate
Revolution Renaissance
Russkaja
Seven Kingdoms
Siebenbürgen
Seventh Void
The Sins of Thy Beloved
Skindred
Skyblood
The Smashing Pumpkins
Stream of Passion
Stuck Mojo
Sumo Cyco
Svartsot
The Sword
Trail of Tears
Tristania
Týr
Valient Thorr
Vesania
Visceral Evisceration
Vista Chino
Walls of Jericho
WeltenBrand
Zodiac

Distribution 
Universal Music Group (Germany, Austria, Switzerland)
Warner Music Group (on behalf of ADA) (US)
The Orchard (Canada, UK, Nordics)

References

External links 
 Homepage

 
Heavy metal record labels
Austrian independent record labels
Economy of Styria